Statistics of Portuguese Liga in the 1973–74 season.

Overview
It was contested by 16 teams, and Sporting Clube de Portugal won the championship.

League standings

Results

Season statistics

Top goalscorers

Footnotes

External links
 Portugal 1973-74 - RSSSF (Jorge Miguel Teixeira)
 Portuguese League 1973/74 - footballzz.co.uk
 Portugal - Table of Honor - Soccer Library

Primeira Liga seasons
1973–74 in Portuguese football
Portugal